Berezhnovka is a rural locality (a selo) and the administrative center of Berezhnovskoye Rural Settlement, Nikolayevsky District, Volgograd Oblast, Russia. The population was 1,639 as of 2010. There are 26 streets.

Geography 
Berezhnovka is located on Transvolga, on the east bank of the Volgograd Reservoir, 46 km northeast of Nikolayevsk (the district's administrative centre) by road. Politotdelskoye is the nearest rural locality.

References 

Rural localities in Nikolayevsky District, Volgograd Oblast